Mohammad Shaker Kargar (born  in Andkhoy District, Faryab Province, Afghanistan) - is an Afghan politician, who is serving as the Chief of Staff to President Ashraf Ghani of the Islamic Republic of Afghanistan.

Biography 

Shaker Kargar was born on 2 February 1967 in Andkhoy District, Faryab province (Afghanistan). His father - Abdul Rasul Kargar - is a famous teacher and a mayor of the city Andkhoy.

Mohammad Shaker started his primary education in 1973 at Andkhoy central school, and then continued his secondary education at Shah Shahid School in Kabul province and finally ended a high school at Abu Muslim Andkhoy with honour.

For the higher education, he enrolled at the Kabul University in 1984. Then he received a scholarship for continued study at master level in the field of Rights and History at Governmental University of Hertsen Petersburg in 1991. Finally, M. Shaker received a doctorate in philosophical sciences.

In 2011 Mohammad Shaker Kargar has received an Honorary doctorate in international law from The Herzen State Pedagogical University of Russia.

Personal life 
Mohammad Shaker Kargar is married, has two children, a son and a daughter.

Career 
Educated in 1993, Mohammad Shaker has started working as CEO of international business companies. For peace and stability in Afghanistan, he also participates in many national and international peaceful and political meetings in different countries, such as the United States, Canada, the Netherlands, Turkey, Italy and The Commonwealth of Independent States.

In 2001 he participated in the Bonn conference as the First Deputy President of Afghanistan, after that he was commissioned to head The Ministry of Energy and Water Resources as part of the interim government of the Islamic Republic of Afghanistan.

In 2002 following the results of the Bonn conference, Shaker became one of the 5 vice presidents of Afghan Transitional Authority.

2003 - 2005. He has served as Minister of Energy and Water. As minister, he actively participated in the development of infrastructure of Afghanistan.

In 2005 Mohammad Shaker Kargar was elected as a deputy of the Wolesi Jirga from the Northern province of Faryab and was appointed to the Parliamentary Commission on International Relations.

In 2012 Mohammad Kargar assumed the authority for being the Ambassador of Afghanistan to the Republic of Azerbaijan. He made a great contribution to the development of relations between countries.

In 2013 he was appointed to the rank of Minister of Trade and Industry.

Since 2015, he has taken the responsibilities for the special representative of the President of Afghanistan for cooperation with Russia and the CIS countries.
In 2019 he resigned from this post.

In 2020 Mohammad Shaker was appointed to head the administration of  the President of the Islamic Republic of Afghanistan.

See also

 Politics of Afghanistan
 Economy of Afghanistan
 Ashraf Ghani

References

Living people
1967 births
Politics of Afghanistan
Afghan politicians
Afghan government officials
Vice presidents of Afghanistan
Energy ministers of Afghanistan
Industry ministers of Afghanistan
Trade ministers of Afghanistan
Water ministers of Afghanistan
Faryab Province
Herzen University alumni